Protheriodon is an extinct genus of probainognathian cynodonts which existed in the Santa Maria Formation of the Paraná Basin in southeastern Brazil during the middle Triassic period. It contains the species Protheriodon estudianti. It was first described by Argentine palaeontologist José Bonaparte, who assigned it to the family Brasilodontidae. More recent studies have however recovered it in a more basal position than other brasilodontids, just outside Prozostrodontia.

Cladogram from Martinelli et al., 2017:

References 

Prehistoric cynodont genera
Ladinian genera
Middle Triassic synapsids of South America
Triassic Brazil
Fossils of Brazil
Santa Maria Formation
Fossil taxa described in 2006
Taxa named by José Bonaparte
Prehistoric probainognathians